Gor Agbaljan (born 25 April 1997) is an Armenian professional footballer who most recently played for Dutch club Go Ahead Eagles, as a midfielder.

Career
Born in Talış, Agbaljan has played club football for Heracles Almelo and Go Ahead Eagles.

He has represented Armenia at under-19 and under-21 youth international levels.

References

1997 births
Living people
People from Tartar District
Armenian footballers
Armenia youth international footballers
Armenia under-21 international footballers
Heracles Almelo players
Go Ahead Eagles players
Eredivisie players
Eerste Divisie players
Association football midfielders
Armenian expatriate footballers
Armenian expatriate sportspeople in the Netherlands
Expatriate footballers in the Netherlands